The slaty-blue flycatcher (Ficedula tricolor) is a species of bird in the family Muscicapidae.

Distribution and habitat
It is found in the Indian Subcontinent and Southeast Asia, ranging across Bangladesh, Bhutan, India, Laos, Myanmar, Nepal, Pakistan, Thailand, and Vietnam. Its natural habitat is subtropical or tropical moist montane forests. A single sight was recorded from Sigiriya, Sri Lanka in February 1993.

References

slaty-blue flycatcher
Birds of the Himalayas
Birds of China
Birds of Yunnan
Birds of Northeast India
Birds of Vietnam
slaty-blue flycatcher
Taxonomy articles created by Polbot